Tiripano is a surname. Notable people with the surname include:

Chipo Mugeri-Tiripano (born 1992), Zimbabwean cricketer
Donald Tiripano (born 1988), Zimbabwean cricketer